11 A.M. is a time on the 12-hour clock.

11 A.M. may also refer to:
 11 A.M. (film), a 2013 South Korean film
 11AM (TV series), an Australian TV news program that aired from 1982 to 1999
"11AM", a song by Incubus from their 2001 album Morning View

See also
 11 O'Clock

Date and time disambiguation pages